Oleksandr Ivanovych Shcherbakov (born 31 July 1960) is a Ukrainian professional football manager and former Soviet and Ukrainian player.

References

External links
 

1960 births
Living people
Sportspeople from Kryvyi Rih
Ukrainian footballers
Soviet footballers
Association football forwards
Ukrainian expatriate footballers
Expatriate footballers in Hungary
Expatriate footballers in Poland
Expatriate footballers in Israel
Soviet expatriate sportspeople in Hungary
Ukrainian expatriate sportspeople in Poland
Ukrainian expatriate sportspeople in Israel
FC Kryvbas Kryvyi Rih players
SKA Kiev players
FC Chornomorets Odesa players
FC Dnepr Mogilev players
FC Dynamo Kyiv players
Budapesti VSC footballers
Karpaty Krosno players
Hapoel Be'er Sheva F.C. players
FC Dnister Ovidiopol players
FC Birzula Podilsk players
SC Odesa players
Ukrainian Premier League players
Soviet Top League players
Ukrainian football managers
SC Odesa managers
FC Dnipro Cherkasy managers
FC Stal Kamianske managers
FC CSKA-2 Kyiv managers
SC Chaika Petropavlivska Borshchahivka managers